J. Phillip "Jack" London (April 30, 1937 – January 18, 2021) was an American businessman.

He joined CACI International Inc as a consultant in 1972 and rose through the ranks to become CEO in 1984. London helped the professional services firm become a $5.7 billion dollar world government contracting company providing advanced technology services and solutions for national security missions, electronic warfare and cyber security, with 20,000 employees in 155 locations worldwide. 

A 1959 graduate of the U.S. Naval Academy, London served on active duty as an naval aviator for 12 years during the Cold War and an additional 12 years in the Navy Reserve as an aeronautical engineering duty officer. He served on the boards of the Navy Memorial Foundation, the Naval Historical Foundation, and the Friends of the National World War II Memorial.

Early life and education
London was born to Harry R. and Evalyn P. London. London’s mother said his family came from "pioneers and dirt farmers", including a great-grandfather who participated in the Land Rush of 1889. His maternal family came from Illinois and Missouri and his father’s family came west from Tennessee and Maryland. A student of history and genealogy, London traced his family lineage back to Samuel Nicholson, a Continental Navy officer during the American Revolution and commanding officer of the USS Constitution, for whom he created the Captain Samuel Nicholson Naval and Marine Corps History and Leadership Award to honor a graduating Naval Academy midshipman in 2014.

London was an honor roll student and student body president of Classen High School in Oklahoma City. Witnessing a halftime demonstration by the Navy Blue Angels at an Oklahoma University football game sparked an interest in naval aviation, and he applied and was accepted to the United States Naval Academy, where he graduated with a B.S. in naval engineering and commissioned as an ensign in the U.S. Navy in 1959.

Serving as a naval aviator and carrier pilot, London made 33 deployments in the North Atlantic, the Mediterranean, and the Caribbean with an anti-submarine warfare (ASW) "hunter-killer" unit during the Cold War, including as part of the airborne recovery team for John Glenn's Mercury space flight on Friendship 7, and during the Cuban Missile Crisis aboard the USS Randolph (CV-15) in 1962.

Back on shore duty, London pursued an M.S. in operations research from the Naval Postgraduate School in 1967 and a D.B.A. from George Washington University in 1971.

CACI

London learned computer technology with the Navy and applied his knowledge of naval operations to earn an role at the CACI following his separation from active duty in 1972, which he soon parlayed into a vice president role in 1976 and a seat on the board of directors in 1981. CACI co-founder Herb Karr asked London to take over day-to-day operations as president and CEO in 1984. A hands-on leader, London oversaw CACI's operational turnaround to profitability and growth, and transitioning with the rapidly changing IT market into the information security and intelligence community arenas. 

London is remembered for always signing his letters with "Always my best-Jack." It was both a promise and an expectation as illustrated by his pioneering effort to create an ethics/compliance program ten years before government contractors were required to do so. CACI received a “Best Overall Government Contractor Ethics Program” in the 2008 Government Contractor Ethics Program Ratings released by the Ethisphere Institute and London was recognized as one of the Most Influential People in Business Ethics by them in 2014.  

In an attempt to address accusations that CACI held some responsibility in regard to torture and abuse of prisoners at Abu Ghraib prison during the Iraq War, London authored the book Our Good Name, A Company's Fight to Get the Truth Told About Abu Ghraib. He was also the lead author of Character: The Ultimate Success Factor.

References

External links
 CACI International
 
 Dr. J. Phillip London (jphilliplondon.com)

1937 births
2021 deaths
George Washington University School of Business alumni
American technology chief executives
United States Naval Academy alumni
Naval Postgraduate School alumni